The North Carolina Tar Heels men's soccer team represents the University of North Carolina at Chapel Hill in men's NCAA Division I soccer competition. They compete in the Atlantic Coast Conference.

Since 1947, the university has fielded a men's varsity soccer team. Below is a list of seasons.

Seasons 

* From 1947 to 1952 the Tar Heels competed in the Southern Conference, they joined the ACC in 1953

N/A-The NCAA Division I Men's Soccer Tournament did not exist until 1959, and the ACC Men's Soccer Tournament did not exist until 1987

DNQ-Did not qualify

References

North Carolina Tar Heels soccer seasons
North Carolina Tar Heels